The Ruaraka Sports Club Ground is one of several cricket venues in Nairobi accredited with full ODI status. This ground played host to the 1994  ICC Trophy final and was one of several grounds used during the 2007 World Cricket League Division one matches played in Kenya.

List of Centuries

One Day Internationals

References

Cricinfo ground profile
Google Maps

Kenyan club cricket teams
Sport in Nairobi
Cricket grounds in Kenya